The Zerilli-Marimò / City of Rome Prize for Italian Fiction was an Italian American literary award funded by Baroness Mariuccia Zerilli-Marimò. The award winning book is selected as being especially worthy of the attention of readers in North America and the English-speaking world. The prize is sponsored by various organizations, among which New York University, Harvard University, and the Italian Ministry of Foreign Affairs. The jury consists of 70 members who are fluent in Italian, but of non-European nationality.

Winners of the award
 1998 - Gianni Celati: Avventure in Africa
 1999 - Marcello Fois: Sempre caro
 2000 - Giorgio van Straten: Il mio nome a memoria
 2001 - Roberto Pazzi: Conclave
 2002 - Alessandra Lavagnino: Le bibliotecarie di Alessandria
 2003 - Silvia Bonucci: Voci d'un tempo
 2006 - Valeria Parrella: Per grazia ricevuta
 2008 - Milena Agus: Mal di pietre
 2010 - Helena Janeczek: Le rondini di Montecassino
 2012 - Nicola Gardini: Le parole perdute di Amelia Lynd

References

External links
 Official website
 Zerilli-Marimò Prize pages at City of Rome

American fiction awards
Italian literary awards
New York University
Awards established in 1998
1998 establishments in Italy
1998 establishments in the United States